

Television

Radio

References

West Coast Conference tournament Women's Finals